Aldo Leopold (January 11, 1887 – April 21, 1948) was an American writer, philosopher, naturalist, scientist, ecologist, forester, conservationist, and environmentalist. He was a professor at the University of Wisconsin and is best known for his book A Sand County Almanac (1949), which has been translated into fourteen languages and has sold more than two million copies.

Leopold was influential in the development of modern environmental ethics and in the movement for wilderness conservation. His ethics of nature and wildlife preservation had a profound impact on the environmental movement, with his ecocentric or holistic ethics regarding land. He emphasized biodiversity and ecology and was a founder of the science of wildlife management.

Early life
Rand Aldo Leopold was born in Burlington, Iowa on January 11, 1887. His father, Carl Leopold, was a businessman who made walnut desks and was first cousin to his wife, Clara Starker. Charles Starker, father of Carl and uncle to Clara, was a German immigrant, educated in engineering and architecture. Rand Aldo was named after two of his father's business partners—C. W. Rand and Aldo Sommers—although he eventually dropped the use of "Rand". The Leopold family included younger siblings Mary Luize, Carl Starker, and Frederic. Leopold's first language was German, although he mastered English at an early age.

Aldo Leopold's early life was highlighted by the outdoors. Carl would take his children on excursions into the woods and taught his oldest son woodcraft and hunting. Aldo showed an aptitude for observation, spending hours counting and cataloging birds near his home. Mary would later say of her older brother, "He was very much an outdoorsman, even in his extreme youth. He was always out climbing around the bluffs, or going down to the river, or going across the river into the woods." He attended Prospect Hill Elementary, where he ranked at the top of his class, and then, the overcrowded Burlington High School. Every August, the family vacationed in Michigan on the forested Marquette Island in Lake Huron, which the children took to exploring.

Schooling

In 1900, Gifford Pinchot, who oversaw the newly implemented Division of Forestry in the Department of Agriculture, donated money to Yale University to begin one of the nation's first forestry schools. Hearing of this development, the teenaged Leopold decided on forestry as a vocation. His parents agreed to let him attend The Lawrenceville School, a preparatory college in New Jersey, to improve his chances of admission to Yale. The Burlington High School principal wrote in a reference letter to the headmaster at Lawrenceville that Leopold was "as earnest a boy as we have in school... painstaking in his work.... Moral character above reproach." He arrived at his new school in January 1904, shortly before he turned 17. He was considered an attentive student, although he was again drawn to the outdoors. Lawrenceville was suitably rural, and Leopold spent much time mapping the area and studying its wildlife. Leopold studied at the Lawrenceville School for a year, during which time he was accepted to Yale. Because the Yale School of Forestry granted only graduate degrees, he first enrolled in Sheffield Scientific School's preparatory forestry courses for his undergraduate studies, in New Haven, Connecticut. While Leopold was able to explore the woods and fields of Lawrenceville daily, sometimes to the detriment of his studying, at Yale he had little opportunity to do so; his studies and social life engagements made his outdoor trips few and far between.

Career
In 1909, Leopold was assigned to the Forest Service's District 3 in the Arizona and New Mexico territories. At first, he was a forest assistant at the Apache National Forest in the Arizona Territory. In 1911, he was transferred to the Carson National Forest in northern New Mexico. Leopold's career, which kept him in New Mexico until 1924, included developing the first comprehensive management plan for the Grand Canyon, writing the Forest Service's first game and fish handbook, and proposing Gila Wilderness Area, the first national wilderness area in the Forest Service system.

On April 5, 1923, he was elected an associate member (now called "professional member") of the Boone and Crockett Club, a wildlife conservation organization founded by Theodore Roosevelt and George Bird Grinnell.

In 1924, he accepted transfer to the U.S. Forest Products Laboratory in Madison, Wisconsin, and became an associate director.

In 1933, he was appointed Professor of Game Management in the Agricultural Economics Department at the University of Wisconsin, the first such professorship of wildlife management.  At the same time he was named Research Director of the University of Wisconsin–Madison Arboretum. Leopold and other members of the first Arboretum Committee initiated a research agenda around re-establishing "original Wisconsin" landscape and plant communities, particularly those that predated European settlement, such as tallgrass prairie and oak savanna.

Under the Oberlaender Trust of the Carl Schurz Memorial Foundation, Leopold was part of the 1935 group of six U.S. Forest Service associates who toured the forests of Germany and Austria. Leopold was invited specifically to study game management, and this was his first and only time abroad. His European observations would have a significant impact on his ecological thinking.

Personal life and death

Leopold married Estella Bergere in northern New Mexico in 1912 and they had five children together. They lived in a modest two-story home close to the UW–Madison campus. His children followed in his footsteps as teachers and naturalists: Aldo Starker Leopold (1913–1983) was a wildlife biologist and professor at UC Berkeley; Luna B. Leopold (1915–2006) became a hydrologist and geology professor at UC Berkeley; Nina Leopold Bradley (1917–2011) was a researcher and naturalist; Aldo Carl Leopold (1919–2009) was a plant physiologist, who taught at Purdue University for 25 years; and daughter Estella Leopold (b. 1927) is a noted botanist and conservationist and professor emerita at the University of Washington.

Leopold purchased 80 acres in the sand country of central Wisconsin. The once-forested region had been logged, swept by repeated fires, overgrazed by dairy cows, and left barren. He put his theories to work in the field and eventually set to work writing his best-selling A Sand County Almanac (1949) which was finished just prior to his death. Leopold died of a heart attack while battling a wild fire on a neighbor's property. Leopold is buried at Aspen Grove Cemetery in Burlington.

Today, Leopold's home is an official landmark of the city of Madison.

Ideas
Early on, Leopold was assigned to hunt and kill bears, wolves, and mountain lions in New Mexico. Local ranchers hated these predators because of livestock losses, but Leopold came to respect the animals. One day after fatally shooting a wolf, Leopold reached the animal and was transfixed by a "fierce green fire dying in her eyes." That experience changed him and put him on the path toward an ecocentric outlook. He developed an ecological ethic that replaced the earlier wilderness ethic that stressed the need for human dominance. His rethinking the importance of predators in the balance of nature has resulted in the return of bears and mountain lions to New Mexico wilderness areas.

By the early 1920s, Leopold had concluded that a particular kind of preservation should be embraced in the national forests of the American West. He was prompted to this by the rampant building of roads to accommodate the "proliferation of the automobile" and the related increasingly heavy recreational demands placed on public lands. He was the first to employ the term "wilderness" to describe such preservation. Over the next two decades, he added ethical and scientific rationales to his defense of the wilderness concept. Leopold believed that it is easier to maintain wilderness than to create it. In one essay, he rhetorically asked, "Of what avail are forty freedoms without a blank spot on the map?" Leopold saw a progress of ethical sensitivity from interpersonal relationships, to relationships to society as a whole, to relationships with the land, leading to a steady diminution of actions based on expediency, conquest, and self-interest. Leopold thus rejected the utilitarianism of conservationists such as Theodore Roosevelt.

By the 1930s, Leopold had become one of the first Americans to publish extensively on the startup discipline of wildlife management. He advocated the scientific management of wildlife habitats by both public and private landholders rather than a reliance on game refuges, hunting laws, and other methods intended to protect specific species of desired game. In his 1933 book Game Management, Leopold defined the science of wildlife management as "the art of making land produce sustained annual crops of wild game for recreational use." But, as Curt Meine has pointed out, he also considered it to be a technique for restoring and maintaining diversity in the environment.

The concept of "wilderness" also took on a new meaning; Leopold no longer saw it as a hunting or recreational ground, but as an arena for a healthy biotic community, including wolves and mountain lions. In 1935, he helped found the Wilderness Society, dedicated to expanding and protecting the nation's wilderness areas. He regarded the society as "one of the focal points of a new attitude—an intelligent humility toward Man's place in nature." Science writer Connie Barlow says Leopold wrote eloquently from a perspective that today would be called Religious Naturalism.

Nature writing
Leopold's nature writing is notable for its simple directness. His portrayals of various natural environments through which he had moved, or had known for many years, displayed impressive intimacy with what exists and happens in nature. This includes detailed diaries and journals of his Forest Service activity, hunting and field experience, as well as observations and activities at his Sand County farm. He offered frank criticism of the harm he believed was frequently done to natural systems (such as land) out of a sense of a culture or society's sovereign ownership over the land base – eclipsing any sense of a community of life to which humans belong. He felt the security and prosperity resulting from "mechanization" now gives people the time to reflect on the preciousness of nature and to learn more about what happens there; however, he also wrote, "Theoretically, the mechanization of farming ought to cut the farmer's chains, but whether it really does is debatable."

A Sand County Almanac
The book was published in 1949, shortly after Leopold's death. One of the well-known quotes from the book which clarifies his land ethic is,

A thing is right when it tends to preserve the integrity, stability, and beauty of the biotic community. It is wrong when it tends otherwise. (p.262) 

The concept of a trophic cascade is put forth in the chapter, "Thinking Like a Mountain", wherein Leopold realizes that killing a predator wolf carries serious implications for the rest of the ecosystem — a conclusion that found sympathetic appreciation generations later:

Land ethic
In "The Land Ethic", a chapter in A Sand County Almanac, Leopold delves into conservation in "The Ecological Conscience" section. He wrote: "Conservation is a state of harmony between men and land." He noted that conservation guidelines at the time boiled down to: "obey the law, vote right, join some organizations, and practice what conservation is profitable on your own land; the government will do the rest." (p. 243–244)

Leopold explained:

Legacy 

In 1950 The Wildlife Society honored Leopold by creating an annual award in his name.

The Aldo Leopold Foundation of Baraboo, Wisconsin, was founded in 1982 by Aldo and Estella Leopold's five children as a 501(c)3 not-for-profit conservation organization whose mission is "to foster the land ethic through the legacy of Aldo Leopold." The Aldo Leopold Foundation owns and manages the original Aldo Leopold Shack and Farm and 300 surrounding acres, in addition to several other parcels. Its headquarters is the green-built Leopold Center where it conducts educational and land stewardship programs. The foundation also acts as the executor of Leopold's literary estate, encourages scholarship on Leopold, and serves as a clearinghouse for information regarding Leopold, his work, and his ideas. It provides interpretive resources and tours for thousands of visitors annually, distributes a curriculum about how to use Leopold's writing and ideas in environmental education. The center maintains a robust website and numerous print resources. In 2012, in collaboration with the United States Forest Service, the foundation and the Center for Humans and Nature released the first high-definition, full-length film about Leopold, entitled Green Fire: Aldo Leopold and a Land Ethic for Our Time. The film aired on public television stations across the nation and won a Midwest regional Emmy award in the documentary category.

The Aldo Leopold Wilderness in New Mexico's Gila National Forest was named after him in 1980.

The Leopold Center for Sustainable Agriculture was established in 1987 at Iowa State University in Ames. It was named in honor of Leopold. Since its founding, it has pioneered new forms of sustainable agriculture practices.

The U.S. Forest Service established the Aldo Leopold Wilderness Research Institute at the University of Montana, Missoula in 1993. It is "the only Federal research group in the United States dedicated to the development and dissemination of knowledge needed to improve management of wilderness, parks, and similarly protected areas."

The Aldo Leopold Neighborhood Historic District, which includes Leopold's former home in Albuquerque, New Mexico, was listed on the National Register of Historic Places in 2002.

The Aldo Leopold Legacy Trail System, a system of 42 state trails in Wisconsin, was created by the state in 2007.

The Leopold Center for Sustainable Agriculture in Iowa, created through the 1987 Iowa Groundwater Protection Act is committed to "new ways to farm profitably while conserving natural resources as well as reducing negative environmental and social impacts".

An organization, the Leopold Heritage Group, is "dedicated to promoting the global legacy of Aldo Leopold in his hometown of Burlington, Iowa."

Works 
 Report on a Game Survey of the North Central States (Madison: SAAMI, 1931)
 Game Management (New York: Scribner's, 1933)
 A Sand County Almanac (New York: Oxford, 1949)
 Round River: From the Journals of Aldo Leopold (New York: Oxford, 1953)
 A Sand County Almanac and Other Writings on Ecology and Conservation (New York: Library of America, 2013)

See also
 Grey Owl
 Timeline of environmental events
 Land Ethic
 Sand County Foundation
 Yale School of Forestry & Environmental Studies
 Aldo Leopold Legacy Trail System
 Aldo Leopold Wilderness
 Leopold Wetland Management District
 Ian McTaggart-Cowan
 J. Drew Lanham

Notes

References
 Errington, P. L. 1948. "In Appreciation of Aldo Leopold". The Journal of Wildlife Management, 12(4).
 Flader, Susan L. 1974. Thinking like a Mountain: Aldo Leopold and the Evolution of an Ecological Attitude toward Deer, Wolves, and Forests. Columbia: University of Missouri Press. .
 Lorbiecki, Marybeth. 1996. Aldo Leopold: A Fierce Green Fire. Helena, Mont.: Falcon Press. .
 Meine, Curt. 1988. Aldo Leopold: His Life and Work. Madison: University of Wisconsin Press. .

Further reading 
 Callicott, J. Baird. 1987. Companion to A Sand County Almanac: Interpretive and Critical Essays. Madison, Wis.: University of Wisconsin Press. .
 
 Knight, Richard L. and Suzanne Riedel (ed). 2002. Aldo Leopold and the Ecological Conscience. Oxford University Press. .
 Lannoo, Michael J. 2010. Leopold's Shack and Ricketts's Lab: The Emergence of Environmentalism. Berkeley: University of California Press. .
 Lutz, Julianne. Aldo Leopold's Odyssey: Rediscovering the Author of A Sand County Almanac. Washington, D.C.: Shearwater Books/Island Press, 2006.
 McClintock, James I. 1994. Nature's Kindred Spirits. University of Wisconsin Press. .
 Nash, Roderick. 1967. Wilderness and the American Mind, New Haven: Yale University Press.
 Newton, Julianne Lutz. 2006. Aldo Leopold's Odyssey. Washington: Island Press/Shearwater Books. .
 
 Sutter, Paul S. 2002. Driven Wild: How the Fight against Automobiles Launched the Modern Wilderness Movement. Seattle: University of Washington Press. .
 Tanner, Thomas. 1987. Aldo Leopold: The Man and His Legacy. Ankeny, Iowa Soil Conservation Soc. of America.

External links

 Aldo Leopold Foundation
 Leopold Heritage Group
 The Aldo Leopold Archives Digitized archival materials held by the University of Wisconsin–Madison Archives.
 Leopold Conservation Award
 Excerpts from the Works of Aldo Leopold
 
 The Land Ethic—neohasid.org
 The Encyclopedia of Earth
 Leopold Education Project
 Aldo Leopold: Learning from the Land Documentary produced by Wisconsin Public Television
 
 

1887 births
1948 deaths
American conservationists
American foresters
American hunters
American naturalists
American non-fiction environmental writers
American people of German descent
Environmental ethicists
Green thinkers
John Burroughs Medal recipients
People from Burlington, Iowa
Writers from Madison, Wisconsin
Lawrenceville School alumni
Yale University alumni
Yale School of Forestry & Environmental Studies alumni
Activists from Iowa
American nature writers
American male non-fiction writers
20th-century American non-fiction writers
People from Baraboo, Wisconsin
20th-century naturalists
20th-century American male writers